Giacomo Leone (born 10 April 1971 in Francavilla Fontana, Brindisi) is a retired male long-distance runner from Italy. He set his personal best (2:07:52) in the marathon on 4 March 2001 in Otsu, Japan. Leone is best known for winning the 1996 edition of the New York City Marathon.

Biography
He was the last European to win New York City Marathon before the African dominance, except Brazilian victories in 2006 and 2008. Leone still holds the record of "Italian most quick" to NYC Marathon.

When 18–20 years old he started to run distances over 20 km and in 1989 won the bronze medal in European Athletics Junior Championships (in 1989 edition in Varaždin, on 20 km Road Race); in the next year he places himself at fifth place at Juniores World Championship on the same distance. When he was 20 debuts in marathon at Sheffield Universiade.

Achievements

See also
 Men's marathon Italian record progression
 Italian all-time lists - half marathon
 Italian all-time lists - Marathon

References

External links
 

1971 births
Living people
People from Francavilla Fontana
Italian male long-distance runners
Italian male marathon runners
Athletes (track and field) at the 2000 Summer Olympics
Olympic athletes of Italy
New York City Marathon male winners
Athletics competitors of Fiamme Oro
World Athletics Championships athletes for Italy
Sportspeople from the Province of Brindisi